Ilda Kepić (born 17 January 1995) is a Danish/Montenegrin handball player who currently plays for ŽRK Budućnost Podgorica and the Montenegrin national team.

References

1995 births
Living people
Danish people of Montenegrin descent
Danish female handball players
Montenegrin female handball players
People from Thisted
Sportspeople from the North Jutland Region